Hajjiabad County is in Hormozgan province, Iran. The capital of the county is the city of Hajjiabad, located about 100 km north of Bandar Abbas (the capital of the province) and best known for its citrus produce. At the 2006 census, the county's population was 62,442 in 15,056 households. The following census in 2011 counted 65,889 people in 17,580 households. At the 2016 census, the county's population was 69,625 in 20,700 households.

Administrative divisions

The population history and structural changes of Hajjiabad County's administrative divisions over three consecutive censuses are shown in the following table. The latest census shows three districts, six rural districts, and three cities.

References

 

Counties of Hormozgan Province